Julio Rivera Lopez Stadium is a stadium in Hormigueros, Puerto Rico.  It hosted some of the Softball events for the 2010 Central American and Caribbean Games.

References

2010 Central American and Caribbean Games venues